Totakeke may refer to:

Totakeke (musician)
K.K. Slider, also known as Totakeke, a character in Animal Crossing, a video game developed by Nintendo
Kazumi Totaka, a video game composer with Nintendo for whom the Animal Crossing character was named